Kristian Kristiansen  (born 21 August 1948) is a Danish archaeologist known for his contributions to the study of Bronze Age Europe, heritage studies and archaeological theory. He is a professor at the University of Gothenburg.

Education and career 
Kristiansen was born in Hyrup on 21 August 1948. He studied prehistoric archaeology at Aarhus University and the University of Copenhagen, obtaining his Special Magister Thesis from Aarhus University in 1975, and his Dr Phil at Aarhus University in 1998 on his synthesis "Europe Before History". He was the director of the Danish Archaeological Heritage Administration from 1979 to 1994, and since then has been a professor at the University of Gothenburg.

Kristiansen initiated the founding of the European Association of Archaeologists in 1994, and served as its first president until 1998. He was also the founding editor the European Journal of Archaeology. He has held visiting professorships at the Sorbonne, Stanford University, the University of Cambridge and the University of Oxford.

Awards and honours 
 Knight of the Order of the Dannebrog, 1985
 Honorary fellow of the Society of Antiquaries of Scotland, 1991
 Member of the Royal Society of Sciences and Letters in Gothenburg, 1994
 Foreign member of the Royal Swedish Academy of Letters, History and Antiquities, 2002
 European Archaeological Heritage Prize, 2005
 Society for American Archaeology Book Award, 2007 (for The Rise of Bronze Age Society)
 Honorary fellow of the Society of Antiquaries of London, 2009
 British Academy Grahame Clark Medal, 2016

Selected publications

References

External links 
 Staff profile at the University of Gothenburg

1948 births
Danish archaeologists
Prehistorians
Aarhus University alumni
University of Copenhagen alumni
Academic staff of the University of Gothenburg
Knights of the Order of the Dannebrog
Fellows of the Society of Antiquaries of Scotland
Fellows of the Society of Antiquaries of London
Members of the Royal Society of Sciences and Letters in Gothenburg
Members of the Royal Swedish Academy of Letters, History and Antiquities
Recipients of the Grahame Clark Medal
Living people